Fernando Henderson is a Dominican Republic diver. He competed in the men's 3 metre springboard event at the 1984 Summer Olympics.

References

Year of birth missing (living people)
Living people
Dominican Republic male divers
Olympic divers of the Dominican Republic
Divers at the 1984 Summer Olympics
Place of birth missing (living people)